Ben Green is an American singer-songwriter and musician best known for the charting success of, Two to One, which peaked at #27. as well as being a film director, writer, and producer whose film short, Pipe Dreams, was the winner of Best Showcase Short Film, at the SOHO International Film festival in 2011. He is the owner and CEO of the Peekskill Clay Studio and the Peekskill Hat Factory, an 80,000 square ft. historic commercial building in Peekskill, New York.

Music career
After graduating from Skidmore College with a BA, Green signed with EMI publishing and its subsidiary SBK Records in 1990 and performed in the club scene in New York City. He released a self-titled record on Artemis Records in 2002, yielding a Top-30 hit, Two To One, which received favorable reviews. Green has shared the stage with Jim Brickman and The Bacon Brothers, among others.

His songs have been featured in various mediums including films such as  the title track, The Finest Hour, for The Finest Hour starring Rob Lowe as well as Imaginary Lights for Meet Me in Miami, which Green both wrote and performed. Other creative projects include writing and directing a short film, Pipe Dreams, featuring an ensemble cast including Debbie Harry that was showcased at film festivals internationally, winning the SOHO International Film Festival’s award for Best Short Film in 2011

 Charting Singles
 2002 - Two to One, peaked at #27 in R&R (magazine)'s Adult Contemporary Top 30 - August 23, 2002 
 2002 - Two to One, earned a spot at #78 on the Adult Contemporary's Most Played Songs chart of 2002.
 2002 - Without You, R&R (magazine)'s New & Active Chart- April 4, 2003
 Album Cuts
 1994 - Buddy Miles - Nothing Left to Lose - Album :To Hell and Back.
 1997 - Warren Hill - You're My Only Love - Album: Shelter

Business career
In 1997, Green took stewardship of The Peekskill Hat Factory (est. 1882). Having once manufactured hats, the historic buildings had been converted to a mixed-use commercial industrial complex in the 1950s. After a sustained campaign of improvements and modernization, the Hat Factory is now home to a mix 
of commercial tenants many of whom are in the creative arts industry, including the Peekskill Clay Studios, which Green founded in 2010. He has been an advocate for bringing art centers as a cultural component to Peekskill, New York “Because the city of Peekskill invested so much in creating an artist community, there’s now a uniquely concentrated and qualified creative workforce,” Green said, “That’s important. That means businesses can come in here, come up here to Peekskill, and tap into this foundation that’s already laid before”.  Green is also the founder and former chair of ''Art Industry Media (AIM).

Early life
Green was born to parents George and Sheila (née Greenwald) Green, in New York, New York on August 31, 1964 His father is a cardiac surgeon and his mother, a children's book author.  Green began playing piano at the age of three and began writing songs when he was in his teens. While attending Skidmore College, he began playing in clubs and pursuing a career in music.

Personal life
Green is married to singer-songwriter Francesca Beghe.  They have one son, James, and reside in Garrison, New York.

References

Categories

1964 births
20th-century American composers
20th-century American keyboardists
20th-century American male musicians
20th-century American singers
21st-century American composers
21st-century American keyboardists
21st-century American male musicians
21st-century American singers
American male pianists
American male pop singers
American male singer-songwriters
Living people